The rainbow has been a favorite component of mythology throughout history. Rainbows are part of the myths of many cultures around the world. The Norse saw it as Bifrost; Abrahamic traditions see it as a covenant with God not to destroy the world by means of floodwater. Whether as a bridge to the heavens, messenger, archer's bow, or serpent, the rainbow has been pressed into symbolic service for millennia. There is a myriad of beliefs concerning the rainbow. The complex diversity of rainbow myths are far-reaching, as are their inherent similarities.

Rainbow deities 
In Mesopotamian and Elamite mythology, the goddess Manzat was a personification of the rainbow.
In Greek mythology, the goddess Iris personifies the rainbow. In many stories, such as the Iliad, she carries messages from the gods to the human world, thus forming a link between heaven and earth. Iris's messages often concerned war and retribution. In some myths, the rainbow merely represents the path made by Iris as she flies.
Many Aboriginal Australian mythologies include a Rainbow Serpent deity, the name and characteristics of which vary according to cultural traditions. It is often seen as a creator god, and also as a force of destruction. It is generally considered to control the rain, and conceals itself in waterholes during the dry season.
In Chinese mythology, Hong is a two-headed dragon that represents the rainbow.
In Mesoamerican cultures, Ix Chel is a maternal jaguar goddess associated with rain. Chel means rainbow in the Yucatán Poqomchi' language. Ix Chel wears a serpent headdress and presides principally over birth and healing.
Anuenue, the rainbow maiden, appears in Hawaiian legends as the messenger for her brothers, the gods Tane and Kanaloa.
Several West African religions incorporate personified rainbow spirits. Examples include Oxumare in the Yoruban religion Ifá; Ayida-Weddo in Haitian Vodou, as practiced in Benin; and the pythons Dagbe Dre and Dagbe Kpohoun in West African Vodun, as practiced by the Ewe people of Benin.
In Māori mythology there are several personifications for the rainbow, depending on its form, who usually appear representing omens and are appealed to during times of war. The most widespread of these are Uenuku and Kahukura.
For the Karen people of Burma, the rainbow is considered as a painted and dangerous demon that eats children.
In Muisca religion, Cuchavira, who was called "shining air" is the rainbow deity, which in the Andes rain and sun were both very important for their agriculture.
Amitolane is a rainbow spirit from the mythology of the Zuni, a Native American tribe.

Rainbow bridges

In Norse religion, a burning rainbow bridge called the Bifrost connects Midgard (earth) with Asgard, home of the gods. Bifrost can be used only by gods and those who are killed in battle. It is eventually shattered under the weight of war – the Ragnarok (German Götterdämmerung). The notion that the rainbow bridge to heaven is attainable by only the good or virtuous, such as warriors and royalty, is a theme repeated often in world myths.
In Japanese mythology, the Floating Bridge of Heaven may have been inspired by the rainbow. The creator deities Izanami and Izanagi stood upon this bridge as they brought the Japanese archipelago into existence.
In Navajo tradition, the rainbow is the path of the holy spirits, and is frequently depicted in sacred sandpaintings.
Māori mythology tells a tale of Hina, the moon, who caused a rainbow to span the heavens even down to the earth, for her mortal husband to return to earth to end his days, since death may not enter her celestial home.
Shamans among Siberia's Buryats speak of ascending to the sky-spirit world by way of the rainbow.

Rainbows and archery
The rainbow is depicted as an archer's bow in Hindu mythology. Indra, the god of thunder and war, uses the rainbow to shoot arrows of lightning.
In pre-Islamic Arabian mythology, the rainbow is the bow of a weather god, Quzaḥ, whose name survives in the Arabic word for rainbow,  qaws Quzaḥ, "the bow of Quzaḥ".
The Sumerian farmer god Ninurta defended Sumer with a bow and arrow, and wore a crown described as a rainbow.

Rainbow taboos
The Sumu of Honduras and Nicaragua refer to the rainbow as walasa aniwe, "the devil is vexed". These people hide their children in their huts to keep them from looking or pointing at the rainbow. Similar taboos against pointing at rainbows can be found throughout the world, in over a hundred cultural traditions.
In Amazonian cultures, rainbows have long been associated with malign spirits that cause harm, such as miscarriages and (especially) skin problems. In the Amuesha language of central Peru, certain diseases are called ayona'achartan, meaning "the rainbow hurt my skin". A tradition of closing one's mouth at the sight of a rainbow in order to avoid disease appears to pre-date the Incan empire.
In the mythology of ancient Slavs, a man touched by the rainbow is drawn to heaven, and becomes a "Planetnik" – half-demonic creature – which is under the power of the thunder and lightning god Perun.

Other legends
In the Hebrew Book of Genesis, after the flood had almost wiped out the entire human race, God told Noah that he will set the rainbow as a token of his promise that he would never send another flood large enough to destroy all life. It is said that no rainbows appeared during the lifetime of 2nd-century rabbi Simeon bar Yochai, as his own righteousness was sufficient to guarantee God's mercy.
 In Ireland, a common legend asserts that a pot of gold is to be found at the end of a rainbow, guarded by a leprechaun.
 In a Chinese folktale, Hsienpo and Yingt'ai are star-crossed lovers who must wait until the rainbow appears to be alone together. Hsienpo is the red in the rainbow, and Yingt'ai is the blue.
 The Fang of Gabon (Africa) are initiated into the religion by a "transcendent experience when they arrive at the rainbow's center, for there they can see both the entire circle of the rainbow and of the earth, signaling the success of their vision". The Fang also prohibit their children from looking at the rainbow.
 For Buddhists, the rainbow is "the highest state achievable before attaining Nirvana, where individual desire and consciousness are extinguished." Accordingly there is mention of a rainbow body.
 According to syncretic Malay shamanism and folklore, the rainbow is said to have been formed from the sword of the earth serpent Sakatimuna who was defeated by the archangel Gabriel.
 In Bulgarian legends, it is said that a person who walk beneath a rainbow will change genders: a man will begin to think like a woman, and a woman will begin to think like a man.
 Rainbows are widely seen in Native American stories and prophecies. The Cherokee believe the rainbow forms the hem of the Sun's coat.

References

Comparative mythology
Mythology